Raymond Ernest Bond (born 7 September 1944) is a former English cricketer.  Bond was a left-handed batsman who bowled right-arm medium-fast.  He was born in Burnham, Buckinghamshire.

Bond made his debut for Buckinghamshire in the 1965 Minor Counties Championship against Suffolk.  Bond played Minor counties cricket for Buckinghamshire from 1965 to 1979, which included 72 Minor Counties Championship matches.  In 1969, he made in his List A debut for Buckinghamshire, against Middlesex in the Gillette Cup.  He played 4 further List A matches for Buckinghamshire, the last coming against Suffolk in the 1979 Gillette Cup.  He also played 4 List A matches for Minor Counties South, spread over the 1973 and 1974 Benson & Hedges Cup  In total, he played 9 List A matches, taking 15 wickets at a bowling average of 18.46, with a single five wicket haul against Cambridgeshire in the 1972 Gillette Cup, with Bond taking figures of 5/17 in the match.

During his career, Bond played just the single first-class match.  This came for a combined Minor Counties cricket team against the touring West Indians in 1973.  He wasn't required to bat in this match, but did take 2 wickets: Roy Fredericks' in both the West Indian first-innings and second-innings.

References

External links
Raymond Bond at ESPNcricinfo
Raymond Bond at CricketArchive

1944 births
Living people
People from Burnham, Buckinghamshire
People from Buckinghamshire
English cricketers
Buckinghamshire cricketers
Minor Counties cricketers